Federal Highway 55D (Carretera Federal 55D) is a part of the federal highways corridors of Mexico as an autopista. The highway connects Atlacomulco to the north and Toluca to the south.

References

Mexican Federal Highways